Ryszard Zbrzyzny (born 4 May 1955 in Lubawka) is a Polish politician. He was elected to the Sejm on 25 September 2005, getting 9644 votes in 1 Legnica district as a candidate from Democratic Left Alliance list.

He was also a member of Sejm 1993-1997, Sejm 1997-2001, and Sejm 2001-2005.

See also
Members of Polish Sejm 2005-2007

1955 births
Living people
People from Lubawka
Democratic Left Alliance politicians
Members of the Polish Sejm 1993–1997
Members of the Polish Sejm 1997–2001
Members of the Polish Sejm 2001–2005
Members of the Polish Sejm 2005–2007
Members of the Polish Sejm 2007–2011
Members of the Polish Sejm 2011–2015